Diego Bareiro (born 2 September 1991 in Asunción) is a Paraguayan basketball player. He has been a member of the Paraguay men's national basketball team and participated at the 2014 South American Basketball Championship.

References

Paraguayan men's basketball players
1991 births
Living people
Sportspeople from Asunción
21st-century Paraguayan people